San Luis de la Reina is a municipality (north of San Miguel) in the San Miguel department of El Salvador.

Municipalities of the San Miguel Department (El Salvador)